The 2007 Western Kentucky Hilltoppers football team represented Western Kentucky University (WKU) during the 2007 NCAA Division I FCS football season. The team's head coach was David Elson. It was the team’s first and only season as an NCAA Division I FCS independent team as they made the transition from the Gateway Conference of Division I-AA (now FCS) to the Sun Belt Conference of the FBS. The Hilltoppers played their home games at Houchens Industries–L. T. Smith Stadium in Bowling Green, Kentucky.

Schedule
*Schedule Source:

Coaching staff

Game summaries

at Florida

West Virginia Tech

Eastern Kentucky

at Middle Tennessee State

at Bowling Green

at Ball State

at Indiana State

North Carolina Central

at Chattanooga

Troy

Morehead State

at North Texas

References

Western Kentucky
Western Kentucky Hilltoppers football seasons
Western Kentucky Hilltoppers football